British Vietnamese International School in Ho Chi Minh City, commonly referred to as BVIS HCMC, is a leading bilingual international school in Vietnam, and the only bilingual school in Vietnam that is fully accredited by the Council of International Schools (CIS) and Western Association of Schools and Colleges (WASC). The school is also a member of the prestigious FOBISIA group of schools, and is part of the Nord Anglia Education Group - the world's largest premium school's group.

BVIS HCMC offers an international environment to its students and seeks to develop a global mindset amongst them, whilst embracing the Vietnamese language and Vietnamese cultural values and traditions. The school has a unique licence in Vietnam that allows it to offer an international curriculum (English National Curriculum, international GCSEs and A Levels) in a bilingual environment.

BVIS HCMC graduates study in the leading universities worldwide, with a particular focus on top USA, UK, Canadian, and Australian universities. Every year, a number of graduates score Best in Vietnam and/or Outstanding Achievement in their A Level exams, and the overall exam results are outstanding.

BVIS educates children at preschool, primary and secondary level. The school uses the English National Curriculum with modules from the Vietnamese curriculum that are believed to be particularly strong: Vietnamese Literature, History and Geography. The school's students graduate with international GCSE and A Level qualifications, which are accepted by all of the leading universities in the world.

History 
BVIS was officially established in August 2011 after the success of its well-known sister school British International School which was established in 1997.

Educational Philosophy 
BVIS's educational philosophy is “Global Citizen - Vietnamese Perspective”. The school aims to educate children to become internationally minded and comfortable studying, living and working anywhere in the modern world, whilst still being able to relate to their Vietnamese identity. Students are fully fluent in both English and Vietnamese upon graduation, and demonstrate universal values such as personal integrity, respect for others and care for the community and global issues. In addition, the school is set toward nurturing and developing lifelong learners who enquire, persevere, and reflect. With a commitment to developing and nurturing a global mindset for every student, the school also seeks to protect and celebrate Vietnamese cultural values and traditions.

Curriculum

Curriculum Offered 
The BVIS curriculum is based on the National Curriculum of England but has been adapted to provide high-quality education in both English and Vietnamese. The curriculum is divided into 5 Key Stages from Early Years Foundation Stage to Secondary.

 Age 2-4: British Early Years Foundation Stage Framework 
 Age 5-10 (Lower to Upper Primary) the National Curriculum of England and the International Primary Curriculum within the learning context of Vietnam 
 Age 11-13 (Key Stage 3): the National Curriculum of England  
 Age 14-16 (Key Stage 4): the International General Certificate of Secondary Education 
 Age 17-18 (Key Stage 5): the International A Level programme

Academic Qualifications 
 International A Levels
 International AS Levels
 International GCSEs

Student Academic Achievement 

 100% A Level pass rate for the Class of 2021  
 The percentage of students achieving A*-C grades, including English and Math at IGCSE is 89% in 2021
 50% of all A Level grades were A or A* I 2021

Beyond The Classroom 
The school offers a wide range of opportunities to participate in Extra-Curricular Activities (ECA's) after school.

Thanks to the collaboration with UNICEF, MIT and Juilliard, BVIS students join in global trips and local excursions such as Tanzania Community Trip, UN High Level Conference or STEAM festival to develop social responsibility and global citizenship.

School Facilities 
BVIS HCMC is a purpose-built school to inspire students. The school has all the dedicated facilities and is equipped with cutting-edge technology to serve the learning community.

 An "early years" soft play area 
 An outdoor area specially designed for Early Years including a climbing castle, sandpit and splash pool 
 Two 25-metre swimming pools 
 Bilingual library, bursting with 70,000+ English and Vietnamese books  
 STEAM room complete with laser cutter, robotics, and 3D printing 
 Fully equipped, 200-seat theatre and black box performing space  
 Double-size dance studio Spacious art and design studios 
 Open spaces and large all-weather playing field, large multipurpose double-size sports hall 
 Presenting technology, like iPad screen mirroring, flat-panel displays, and interactive projectors in every classroom.

References 

Schools in Vietnam